Taycheedah, Wisconsin is an unincorporated census-designated place in the Town of Taycheedah in Fond du Lac County, Wisconsin. The community is located adjacent to the city of Fond du Lac and Lake Winnebago. As of the 2010 census, its population is 704. Taycheedah calls itself the "Sheepshead Fishing Center of the World". U.S. Route 151 ran through the community until a bypass around Fond du Lac was built in the 2000s.

Taycheedah Correctional Institution is located in the town of Taycheedah several miles east of the community.

History
The first white settlement at Taycheedah was made in 1839. A post office called Taycheedah was established in 1841, and remained in operation until it was discontinued in 1986. The name Taycheedah is derived from a Native American word meaning "lake camp".

Images

References

Census-designated places in Wisconsin
Census-designated places in Fond du Lac County, Wisconsin